Leonardo Lago Faedo (born May 13, 1960) is a former Major League Baseball shortstop. He played all or parts of five seasons in the majors, from  until , for the Minnesota Twins. In 1978, he won the Tony Saladino Award, which went yearly to the top baseball player in Hillsborough County.

Pro career
Lenny Faedo was drafted by the Minnesota Twins in the first round 16th overall in the 1978 MLB draft, two spots behind a future teammate, Tom Brunansky. Faedo was assigned to the Elizabethton Twins of the Appalachian League, where he was teammates with another player the Twins had acquired in an earlier draft, pitcher Jesse Orosco. After batting .280 in his first professional season, the Twins saw enough in Faedo that they promoted him the following season to their AA affiliate, the Orlando Twins of the Southern League. While Faedo wasn't imposing at the plate, the Twins saw enough in his fielding that in 1980, they promoted him to the club midway through the 1980 season from Orlando meaning that Faedo skipped an entire level of development and was promoted to the majors.

At just 20 years old, Faedo was in the majors. While his first stay was brief, The Twins returned Faedo to the minor leagues for the 1981 season, where he played for their top affiliate, the Toledo Mud Hens. he had another cup of coffee in 1981, but in 1982 appeared to be on the verge of locking down the role of the Twins regular shortstop. On July 20, 1982, the Twins were playing the Milwaukee Brewers, a game that would feature a bench clearing brawl. In the fifth inning, Twins first baseman Kent Hrbek made a hard slide into Brewers second baseman Jim Gantner. In the sixth, Brewers shortstop Robin Yount ran over Faedo, which touched off a brawl. At the end of the brawl, Hrbek and Brewers pitcher Bob McClure were ejected from the game.

In 1983, Faedo backed-up Ron Washington, appearing in 51 games. In 1984, the Twins had a platoon at short, which included Washington, Faedo, Houston Jimenez and Chris Speier. By the time 1985 rolled around, Faedo was out of the picture as the Twins had settled on Greg Gagne to be the team's regular shortstop. Faedo spent the 1985 season in the farm system of the Kansas City Royals. After Kansas City released him, Faedo signed with the Los Angeles Dodgers and spent his final season in their farm system before retiring from baseball at the conclusion of the 1986 season.

After his playing career was over, Faedo was briefly the hitting instructor for the Detroit Tigers.

References

External links
, or Retrosheet, or Pura Pelota (Venezuelan Winter League)
 

1960 births
Living people
Albuquerque Dukes players
Baseball players from Tampa, Florida
Charleston Charlies players
Elizabethton Twins players
Evansville Triplets players
Major League Baseball shortstops
Memphis Chicks players
Minnesota Twins players
Navegantes del Magallanes players
American expatriate baseball players in Venezuela
Oklahoma City 89ers players
Orlando Twins players
San Antonio Dodgers players
Thomas Jefferson High School (Tampa, Florida) alumni
Toledo Mud Hens players